The Zegujani oil field in Florești, Mehedinți County, Romania, was discovered in 2005 and developed by Rompetrol. It began production in 2008.
It has a total surface of 1.800 square kilometres.

References

Oil fields in Romania